Perhonjoki is a river of Finland in Central Ostrobothnia region. It originates in Suomenselkä from the small lakes on the border of the municipalities of Perho, Kyyjärvi and Kivijärvi, and it flows for  into the Gulf of Bothnia.

References

See also
List of rivers of Finland

Perho
Rivers of Finland
Rivers of Kokkola
Drainage basins of the Baltic Sea